The 1934 Minnesota Golden Gophers football team represented the University of Minnesota in the 1934 college football season. In their third year under head coach Bernie Bierman, the Golden Gophers compiled an undefeated 8–0 record, shut out four opponents, and outscored all opponents by a combined total of 270 to 38.

The team was named national champion by eight NCAA-designated major selectors in Billingsley, Boand, Dickinson, College Football Researchers Association, Helms, Litkenhous, National Championship Foundation, and Sagarin), with Alabama also receiving recognition.

Halfback Pug Lund was selected for the team's Most Valuable Player award for the second consecutive year. Lund also received Chicago Tribune Silver Football, awarded to the most valuable player of the Big Ten, and was named an All-American by the AP, Collier's Weekly/Grantland Rice, Liberty, Walter Camp Football Foundation and Look Magazine.

End Frank Larson was named an All-American by the Associated Press (AP), Collier's Weekly/Grantland Rice and Look Magazine. Guard Bill Bevan was named an All-American by Collier's Weekly/Grantland Rice, Liberty and Look Magazine.  End Bob Tenner was named an All-American by the United Press International. Tackle Phil Bengtson, Bevan, Larson, Lund, Tenner, and tackle Ed Widseth were named All-Big Ten.

Total attendance for the season was 192,922, which averaged to 38,584. The season high for attendance was against rival Michigan.

Schedule

Roster
 HB Pug Lund

References

Minnesota
Minnesota Golden Gophers football seasons
College football national champions
Big Ten Conference football champion seasons
College football undefeated seasons
Minnesota Golden Gophers football